No. 10 Squadron RSAF is a squadron of the Royal Saudi Air Force that operates the Eurofighter Typhoon.

References

10